Fonoti is a surname. Notable people with the surname include:

Fou Fonoti (born 1991), American football player
Toniu Fonoti (born 1981), American football player